Jewell Valley is an unincorporated community in southwestern Virginia, located in Buchanan County, Virginia, United States.

Jewell Valley contained a post office from 1937 until 1984. The community was named in honor of the Jewell family.

References

Unincorporated communities in Buchanan County, Virginia
Unincorporated communities in Virginia
Coal towns in Virginia